The 1940 Colorado A&M Aggies football team represented Colorado State College of Agriculture and Mechanic Arts in the Mountain States Conference (MSC) during the 1940 college football season.  In their 30th season under head coach Harry W. Hughes, the Aggies compiled a 3–4–2 record (1–3–2 against MSC opponents), finished fifth in the MSC, and were outscored by a total of 131 to 85.

Schedule

References

Colorado AandM
Colorado State Rams football seasons
Colorado AandM Aggies football